Ossorya is a Polish coat of arms. It was used by several szlachta families in the times of the Polish–Lithuanian Commonwealth.

Notable bearers

Notable bearers of this coat of arms have included:
 
 Borys Martos (1879 – 1977) — Ukrainian politician, pedagogue, economist.

External links 
  Ossorya Coat of Arms & the bearers.

See also
 Polish heraldry
 Heraldry
 Coat of arms

Polish coats of arms